Mary Lawson's Secret is a lost 1917 silent dramatic film directed by John B. O'Brien and starring Charlotte Walker. The Thanhouser Film Company produced the feature with a distribution arrangement through Pathé Exchange. Walker's then husband, writer Eugene Walter, has a cameo part.

Cast
Charlotte Walker - Mary Lawson
William B. Davidson - Dr. Brundage (*as William Davidson)
J.H. Gilmour - Dr. Kirk
N.Z. Wood - Joe, The Village Cobbler (as N.S. Woods)
Inda Palmer - Mrs. Lawson, Mary's Mother
Robert Vaughn - John Harlow
Jean La Motte - ? (*as Gene LaMotte)
Eugene Walter - Man in whiskers in dancing scene

References

External links

glass slide

1917 films
American silent feature films
Lost American films
Thanhouser Company films
American black-and-white films
Silent American drama films
1917 drama films
Pathé Exchange films
1917 lost films
Films directed by John B. O'Brien
1910s American films